Čedo Nikolovski (born 3 May 1961) is a Yugoslav wrestler. He competed in the men's freestyle 82 kg at the 1988 Summer Olympics.

References

1961 births
Living people
Yugoslav male sport wrestlers
Olympic wrestlers of Yugoslavia
Wrestlers at the 1988 Summer Olympics
Place of birth missing (living people)